Homestead High School is a four-year public high school serving western Sunnyvale, southern Los Altos, and northwestern Cupertino, in Santa Clara County, California. Established in 1962, the school serves 2,405 students in grades 9 to 12 as part of the Fremont Union High School District (FUHSD). In 2003 and 2009, the California Department of Education recognized Homestead as a California Distinguished School, and in 2004, the Department of Education recognized Homestead as a Blue Ribbon School.

Demographics
The table below represents the increase in enrolling students between the years 2003 and 2017.

As of the 2017 school year, the racial composition was as follows:

 White: 35.5%
 Asian: 45.1%
 Other: 19.4%

14.8% qualified for free or reduced-price lunch.

History
Homestead High School has played a large role in the development of Silicon Valley. During the late 1960s and 1970s, the school was a haven for students interested in electronics and the emerging computer age.  The school's electronics class is considered as influential as Frederick Terman's program at Stanford University. During this period, the electronics teacher, John McCollum, created a hands-on classroom in which students like Stephen Wozniak  learned while designing, building, repairing, and understanding a range of equipment. The school has a chapter of the Future Business Leaders of America.

Campus

Homestead High School is bordered by Homestead Road to the north and Interstate 280 to the south. Beginning in the summer of 2009, solar panels and shade structures were added over both parking lots, and the fields were reorganized so that a new stadium could be constructed.  The other half of campus, facing Homestead Road, consists of several school buildings. The majority of the buildings have an inner corridor with outdoor corridors connecting the buildings. Green-colored hoofmarks decorate Homestead's sidewalks and walkways, which are from the school's team name and one of the school's colors. The front walls of the school are decorated with murals of a similar theme, including a large mural of a mustang.

Academics
Homestead High School's curriculum includes preparatory courses, vocational training, and general education. The school has a variety of special programs to meet the needs of exceptional students. Homestead offers eight honors classes and 17 open-access Advanced Placement (AP) courses.  Several programs promote positive learning for all students, including AVID and inclusion classes to support the needs of English Language Learners and special education students. The school also offers a peer tutorial program to serve the needs of students unable to pass the California High School Exit Exam and finish graduation requirements.

Music department and marching band

Homestead has a music program consisting of more than a dozen performing groups, including concert bands, a jazz ensemble, a marching band, choral groups, string and symphonic ensembles, and extracurricular performing arts groups such as winter guard and winter percussion. The marching band has enjoyed a continuous run of championship awards, starting in 1993 with their field show rendition of The Phantom of the Opera. Since then, the Mighty Mustang Marching Band has performed such shows as The Who's Tommy, and Miss Saigon. In their first statewide competition in 2005, the band tied for 6th place in the 5A division at the Western Band Association State Championships. In April 2010, Homestead's marching band was one of only 10 high schools nationwide selected to participate in the 2011 Macy's Thanksgiving Day Parade in New York City. In November 2015, the band traveled to their first appearance at the Bands of America Grand National Championships and finished 19th-place as a semifinalist, out of 95 bands. On November 19, 2017, Homestead's Marching Band placed 3rd overall at the 2017 WBA Grand Championships with a score of 94.15, the highest score in Homestead history. On New Year's Day 2018, the band participated at the 129th Annual Tournament of Roses Parade.

The Homestead marching band is under the direction of John Burn.

The jazz, vocal, string and wind ensembles consistently rank Superior in competitions. Many of the musical groups have traveled internationally. The Wind Ensemble and Orchestra performed in Carnegie Hall at the 2007 New York Band and Orchestra Festival, winning Silver Awards for each group. Participating in the 2009 Australian International Music Festival held in the Sydney Opera House on a trip to New Zealand and Australia, the Wind Symphony received a Gold Award, and the Jazz Ensemble received a Silver Award.

Winter Guard
The Winter Guard program has won the California Color Guard Circuit (CCGC) championship six times, as well as Winter Guard International regional competitions.

Winter Percussion
Homestead's Winter Percussion (also known as Indoor percussion ensemble) has competed in the California Color Guard Circuit (CCGC), WGI, the Northern California Percussion Alliance (NCPA), and San Joaquin Valley Color Guard and Percussion Review (SJVCGPR) circuits. Homestead's percussion ensemble was the CCGC 2010 Scholastic World Division Champion, and placed 15th, 7th, 11th, 12th, 13th, and 8th in 2013, 2014, 2015, 2016, 2017, and 2019 respectively at WGI world championships in Dayton, Ohio.

Economics Challenge 
Every spring, Homestead participates in the David Ricardo division of the National Economics Challenge for students not taking AP economics courses, consistently sending teams to the state level. In 2015, Homestead placed first nationally in the David Ricardo division of the National Economics Challenge.

The Epitaph
Homestead's award-winning student newspaper, The Epitaph, won eight Gold Crowns from the early 1980s to the mid-1990s from the Columbia Scholastic Press Association (CSPA). During that same period, it received eight Pacemaker Awards from the National Scholastic Press Association. As late as 1994, these were the most national awards ever given to a high school paper.

In 1988, the paper received one of its highest honors, The Press Freedom Award, from the Student Press Law Center, for its successful defense of a story about a junior boy who was HIV positive, one of the first such stories in any high school newspaper. The story, which had been initially censored by the principal, was allowed to run when the newspaper invoked California Education Code 48907, a California law that protects students' rights to free expression. The story was reported nationally in the wake of a Supreme Court's decision in Hazelwood School District et al. v. Kuhlmeier et al., 484 U.S. 260 (1988). This case gave school officials greater latitude in determining the content of a school's official student publications. The California law made the ruling moot in the state.

During that same period, the paper also won numerous local and state awards. The San Jose Mercury News named the paper the best in its annual contest for Silicon Valley student newspapers ten of the 12 years that the paper ran the contest. It was also awarded the top prize from the San Francisco Press Club several times during that period, as well as the top prize from the now-defunct Palo Alto Times.

The paper's unusual name was selected by the school's first students in 1962. In keeping with the school's western theme and Mustang mascot, they named the paper after the first newspaper west of the Rockies, the Epitaph of Tombstone, Arizona, which had been popularized in a television series of the time about Wyatt Earp, "Tombstone Territory".

Some of the newspaper's former staffers have gone on to work in journalism professionally. Among them, Alex Williams (1983)  and Michael D. Shear (1986) write for the New York Times. Erica Werner (1989) is a White House correspondent for the Associated Press.

The paper's adviser from 1976 to 1994, Nick Ferentinos, was the 1994 Dow Jones News Fund's National High School Journalism Teacher of the Year.

With a gift from alumnus Steve Wozniak (class of 1968), co-founder of Apple, the Epitaph adopted desktop publishing in 1986, among the first high school newspapers to use the technology to produce a student publication.

In 2013, the Epitaph limited print distribution for financial reasons. The Epitaph has been available online since then.

FIRST Robotics Team
Homestead has a robotics team that competes in the FIRST Robotics Competition. The team, FRC team number 670, was created by students in 2001. Alumnus Steve Wozniak and noted electrical engineer Ron Crane have both served as key supporters of the team over the years. The team has a website detailing its history, mission, news, and ongoing activities.

Interact Club
Currently the largest student-run organization on campus, Interact is a club dedicated to developing leadership and character skills as well as allowing members to find their passions. Consisting of over 200 active members, Interact's mission is to provide its members with opportunities to perform service, build character, and develop leadership. The Homestead Interact club is part of District 5170, which is the largest Interact district in the world. Homestead Interact stays in close relations with the district to provide students with volunteer and leadership opportunities that range from learning how to help and interact with local communities to making an impact internationally through causes that are chosen by the district. The Interact club at Homestead is also closely connected with the interact clubs in the Fremont Union High School District, and they work closely together to create ways to fundraise for international projects through car washes, talent shows, dances, and more.

Mathematics competitions
Members of the mathematics team have regularly qualified for the American Invitational Mathematics Examination (AIME). Over the past five years, the team has placed among the top 10 schools in the Mu Alpha Theta National Log 1 Mathematics Contest, taking fifth place nationally in 2009–10, third place in 2008–09, ninth place in 2007–08, and fourth place in 2006 and 2007. From 2003 through 2006, Homestead's math team placed among the top 10 teams nationally in the Ciphering Time Trials, a contest sponsored by National Assessment & Testing. During this period, Homestead's team also placed among the top 20 teams in several other contests sponsored by National Assessment & Testing, including the Team Scramble, the Four-by-Four, and the Collaborative Problem Solving Contests. In 2002, the Mathematical Association of America's American Mathematics Competition (AMC) awarded the Edyth May Sliffe Award for Excellence in Teaching to Homestead teacher and team faculty advisor Steve Headley.

Pegasus
Homestead's yearbook, Pegasus, has been its most award-winning publication of recent years, capturing two National Pacemaker Awards from the National Scholastic Press Association in 2002 and 2005. The Pacemaker is awarded to the 20 best yearbooks in the country, often out of more than a thousand contenders. The yearbook was also an NSPA Pacemaker Finalist in 2000 and 2001. In 2006, the CSPA awarded the Pegasus a Silver Crown. The yearbook has also won a number of other awards, ranging from CSPA Gold Circles (awarded for individual stories, concepts, designs, and photography) to various Best in Show awards.

Science Bowl
Homestead has a team competing in the Science Bowl, a competition sponsored by the U.S. Department of Energy. Over the years, Homestead students have won awards at the National Chemistry Olympiad and the National Science Bowl. Teacher Gareth Wong initially organized and advised the team, and, in 2002, the American Chemical Society recognized his work with a High School Teacher Award for the Western Region. The team is not currently advised by any teacher. On February 10, 2007, Homestead's team won the regional competition held at the SLAC National Accelerator Laboratory, eventually repeating their regional victory on February 2, 2008. At the 2007 National Science Bowl Competition in Washington, D.C., Homestead's team placed 12th out of more than 60 high-school teams, winning a $1,000 prize for the school's science department. In 2009, Homestead made it to the National competition for the third time in a row. At the National Science Bowl Competition, they placed in the top eight out of 67 other high schools.

Athletics
Homestead athletic teams compete in the SCVAL.  The athletic fields and gymnasiums at Homestead underwent reconstruction in 2015–2016, and now boast a state of the art football field with a jumbotron, a new Field House gymnasium, the original gymnasium, and a newly constructed artificial turf baseball field.

Homestead has teams in the following sports:

Badminton
Baseball
Basketball
Cheerleading
Color guard
Cross country
Dance
Diving
Field hockey
Football
Golf
Marching band
Soccer
Softball
Swimming
Tennis
Track and field
Volleyball
Water polo
Wrestling
Winter guard
Winter percussion

Baseball

The Baseball program at Homestead has fielded many collegiate and pro players over the years, including Scott Erickson, a Major League pitcher.  The original baseball program was under the direction of Chuck Camuso, a longtime mentor and leader, who received the CCS Coaches Honor Award in 1993–1994. The baseball team plays its games at the Chuck Camuso Baseball field, a state of the art artificial turf field which was dedicated to the longtime coach in 2014.

Soccer

Homestead Mustang Soccer hosts a Winter Tournament, the Christmas Cup, on a yearly basis at Mustang Field. This tournament brings in highly ranked boys soccer teams from around the valley and has been in existence for over 20 years.  The 2018 Varsity Women's Soccer Team made it to the second level of the CCS finals, where they were defeated by St. Francis High School.  The Homestead team had an award-winning season, including beating top runner Palo Alto.

Track and field

Homestead's distance runners broke a number of records in the late 1960s. They set the national postal 2-mile postal record on November 9, 1968. Five runners averaged 9:26 for two-mile (19 meters longer than the now standard 3200m). In total, 11 Homestead runners broke ten minutes that day. The runners contributing to the national record of 47:11.2 were Jack Christianson (9:17.0), Mike Ferguson (9:17.2), Tom Brassell (9:26.0), Steve Flynn (9:35.4), and John Hanes (9:35.6). The track and field team is headed by coach Kenrick Sealy.

Notable alumni
Homestead has a direct connection to the development of Apple Computer (now Apple Inc.). Co-founders Steve Jobs and Steve Wozniak both graduated from Homestead, as did the early Apple employee who introduced them, Bill Fernandez. Another graduate was Chrisann Brennan, who was Jobs's first girlfriend (also an early employee of Apple) and the mother of his first child, Lisa Brennan-Jobs.

Additional notable alumni of Homestead High School include:

Jeff Baicher, former US National Team Soccer Player, MLS player, Western Soccer League, and American Professional Soccer League player
Smith Cho, American actress
Doug Clarey, former Major League Baseball infielder
Katarina Comesaña, footballer for the Peru women's national football team
Artemis Dafni, former Olympian swimmer
Sean Dawkins, former American college and professional (NFL) football player
Scott Erickson, former Major League Baseball pitcher
Leslie Fu, YouTube streamer 
Dan Gordon, co-founder of Gordon Biersch Brewery
Linda Jezek, 1976 Summer Olympics swimmer 400 m relay silver medalist
Evan Marshall, Major League Baseball pitcher
Daniel Seddiqui, cultural analyst and job hunting expert who worked 50 jobs in 50 states
Jeff Sevy, former American football player
Michael D. Shear, White House correspondent for the New York Times, Pulitzer prizewinning former journalist for the Washington Post
Tony Sly,  American singer, songwriter and guitarist, best known as the frontman of the punk rock band No Use for a Name
Bernie Su, writer, producer of Emmy-winning web series The Lizzie Bennet Diaries
Jillian Weir, former collegiate and Olympic-qualifying hammer thrower
Phil Yu, founder of Angry Asian Man

References

External links

 Homestead High School website
 Fremont Union High School District's Page for HHS
 California Standardized Testing And Reporting Results

Educational institutions established in 1962
Fremont Union High School District
High schools in Santa Clara County, California
Public high schools in California
1962 establishments in California